Harry Sherman Bonner (December 16, 1921 – September 22, 2006), known as Harry Spear was an American child actor, notable for appearing in the Our Gang short subjects series from 1927 to 1929. He was a native of Los Angeles, California.

Our Gang 

Before joining the wildly popular Our Gang series, Spear made appearances in several Buck Jones westerns. He was mainly known as Ginger before appearing in Our Gang owing to his ginger hair.

Spear made his first appearance in the Our Gang series at the age of five in the film Chicken Feed. He was a popular member of the gang during the late silent era (1927–1929), often donning an oversized bowler hat. At the dawn of the sound era, newcomer Jackie Cooper took over the role as the leader/tough guy in the gang, replacing Spear. Spear's final Our Gang film would be Bouncing Babies. After departing the series, Spear briefly entered vaudeville, entertaining audiences with a dancing and monologue routine. By 1971, he had left the entertainment industry and severed ties with his former Our Gang alumni.

Lost Rascal 
Spear's whereabouts after the 1940s remained a mystery for over half a century. However, several diligent Our Gang fans attempted to track down Spear in 1995. Residing in San Diego, California at the time, Spear (who went by his legal name of Harry Bonner) continually denied being the "Harry Spear" of Our Gang fame for unknown reasons, despite overwhelming evidence to the contrary. From U.S. Naval records, it was found that Harry Spear served as a Chief Petty Officer in the U.S. Navy during World War II, the Korean War and Vietnam War.

Death 
Spear died of kidney cancer on September 22, 2006, in San Diego, California. He was 84 years of age.

Personal life 
Spear was managed by his grandmother Bertha Spear, who was also his legal guardian. Some name confusion existed for a while because of a different actor named Harry Spear, who appeared in some bit roles in several movies in the 1960s.

References

External links 

The Strange Tale of Harry Spear
 

American male child actors
American male silent film actors
Deaths from kidney cancer
Deaths from cancer in California
1921 births
2006 deaths
20th-century American male actors
American male comedy actors
Hal Roach Studios actors
Our Gang
United States Navy personnel of World War II
United States Navy personnel of the Korean War
United States Navy personnel of the Vietnam War